The 2010 Honkbal Hoofdklasse season began Saturday, April 10 and ended on September 18.

Standings

The game ADO Den Haag – Sparta/Feyenoord on June 17 ended after the 10th inning in a 2–2 draw, due to the curfew rule.

League leaders

(Updated through August 14)

All-Star game
The 2010 Honkbal Hoofdklasse All-Star Game will be the 1st midseason exhibition between the all-stars divided in teams North and South. The all-stars from Almere, Amsterdam, Bussum and Haarlem will make up team North. The all-stars from The Hague, Hoofddorp and Rotterdam will make up team South.

The game will be held on July 4 at the Leen Volkerijk Stadium, the home of ADO Den Haag.

Rosters
Votes were cast online. The deadline to cast votes was June 27, and the results were published on June 28. Most of the players, 14 out of 19, in team South are players from Corendon Kinheim and L&D Amsterdam. Also, DOOR Neptunus brings 10 players to the All Star Game. Current weakest teams in the 2010 season, ADO Den Haag and Almere Magpies, has the lowest number of representatives.

North

South

Line score

Playoffs
The playoffs began on Thursday, August 19 and will feature the four best teams of the regular season.

Neptunus vs. Pioniers

Kinheim vs. Amsterdam

Playdowns
The playdowns began on Thursday, August 19 and will feature the four weakest teams of the regular season.

HCAW vs. Almere

Sparta/Feyenoord vs. ADO

Degradation Series

Promotion Series

Holland Series

References

External links
De Nederlandse honkbalsite
KNBSB – The Dutch Baseball and Softball Association

Honkbal Hoofdklasse
Honk